Hellinsia ignifugax is a moth of the family Pterophoridae. It is found in Guatemala, Costa Rica, Mexico and Nicaragua.

Adults are on wing in May, August and December.

References

Moths described in 1915
ignifugax
Moths of Central America
Moths of North America